Sean Bowden (born 22 September 1970) is a former Australian rules footballer, later a lawyer. He played for the Richmond Football Club in the Australian Football League (AFL) and Port Melbourne in the Victorian Football Association in 1990 and 1991.

A Law (Honors) graduate from the University of Melbourne, who grew up in Central Australia, Bowden is the founding partner of Northern Territory law firm Bowden McCormack Lawyers + Advisers. He is also a director of AFL Northern Territory Ltd.

Bowden was drafted by Richmond with pick 103 in the 1988 VFL draft and started the 1990 AFL season by becoming the 920th player to debut with the Tigers. He played the first five games of the season and then one final game in 1991. Bowden was the second in his family to pull on the yellow-and-black following father Michael who was a 1969 Premiership player. Later brothers Joel and Patrick also played for Richmond.

References

External links

1970 births
Living people
Richmond Football Club players
Australian rules footballers from Victoria (Australia)
Port Melbourne Football Club players
People from Mildura
People from Alice Springs
Melbourne Law School alumni
21st-century Australian lawyers